Diseworth Heritage Centre is a community-based, not-for-profit heritage centre, at the heart of the Leicestershire village of Diseworth. It was made possible by the restoration of the Baptist Chapel building by the Diseworth Heritage Trust, with major funding from the Heritage Lottery Fund and other supporters.

It is designed to allow a wide variety of activities, having a main hall suitable for meetings, performances and exhibitions, a smaller hall / coffee bar area, and an office suite equipped with IT facilities, suitable for small educational groups.

External links
 Diseworth Heritage Centre

Churches in Leicestershire